Heavy Heart may refer to:

 A metaphor for sadness
 A Heavy Heart, a 2015 German film

Music
 Heavy Heart (band), a British alternative rock band
 Heavy Hearts (band), a Canadian punk rock band
 The Heavy Hearts, an American alternative rock band
 Heavy Heart (album), a 1984 jazz album by Carla Bley
 Heavy Hearts, a 2014 metalcore album by For the Fallen Dreams
 "Heavy Heart" (song), a 1998 alternative rock song by You Am I